Jalan Putrajaya–Dengkil or Jalan Dengkil, Federal Route 214 (formerly Selangor state route B15) is a dual-carriageway federal road in Selangor, Malaysia. The kilometre zero of the Federal Route 214 starts at Dengkil.

History 
In 2012, the road was gazetted as the federal roads by JKR as Federal Route 214.

Features 

At most sections, the Federal Route 214 was built under the JKR R5 road standard, allowing maximum speed limit of up to 90 km/h.

List of junctions

References

Malaysian Federal Roads